Ballyboley is a townland of 783 acres in County Down, Northern Ireland, near Carrowdore on the Ards Peninsula. It is situated in the civil parish of Greyabbey and the historic barony of Ards Lower.

References

Townlands of County Down
Civil parish of Greyabbey